"Get Your Wish" is a song recorded by American electronic music producer Porter Robinson. It was released on January 29, 2020 as the first single from his second studio album Nurture. Robinson wrote, produced, and provided vocals for the track. The song contains elements of 2000s era Japanese animation soundtracks.

An official music video was released alongside the single, and features Robinson singing on a wet platform, seemingly walking on water.

Composition 
"Get Your Wish" features Porter Robinson on vocals, effected to make himself sound higher pitched and more feminine. He stated that he felt that it was "easier to talk about painful subjects directly", and subsequently became fond of the effected voice. The lyrics of the song reflect Robinson's views on depression and ego death.

The song is synth-based.  Robinson has stated he is a fan of Japanese culture, animation, and video games, and it has inspired his music. This is exemplified by the production of the "Shelter" music video which was written by Robinson and animated by A-1 Pictures, a Japanese animation studio.

Music video 
"Get Your Wish" and its music video were released simultaneously, the video immediately available on Robinson's YouTube channel.

In the official music video for "Get Your Wish", Robinson is seen on a platform covered in water. He pulls a microphone out of the water and begins to sing. The video cuts between Robinson singing and sitting and looking forlorn. During the climax, a background behind the platform displays fireworks, intercut with Robinson singing underwater.

Personnel 
Credits adapted from Tidal.

 Porter Robinson - producer, composer, lyricist, mixer
 Zino Mikorey - engineer

Charts

Weekly charts

Year-end charts

Release history

References

External links
 

2020 singles
2020 songs
American synth-pop songs
Porter Robinson songs
Song recordings produced by Porter Robinson
Songs written by Porter Robinson
Mom + Pop Music singles